Charles J. Bullock (1869–1941) was an American economist. He was a professor of economics at Harvard University. He was an expert in public finance.

Early life
Charles J. Bullock was born in 1869. He graduated from Boston University, and he earned a PhD in economics from the University of Wisconsin in 1895. His thesis supervisor was Richard T. Ely.

Career
Bullock taught economics at Cornell University and Williams College. became an assistant professor of economics at Harvard University in 1903. He became a tenured professor in 1908. He was the author of several books. He also edited The Wealth of Nations by Adam Smith in 1909.

Bullock served as a member of the Colorado House of Representatives from 1913 to 1914.

Bullock was an expert in public finance. He advised the governments of Massachusetts and other states on taxation.

Death
Bullock died on March 18, 1941, in Hingham, Massachusetts.

Works

Bullock, C. J. (1897). Introduction to the study of Economics. Silver, Burdett and Company.

Bullock, C. J. (1905). The elements of Economics. Silver, Burdett.

Further reading

References

1869 births
1941 deaths
Boston University alumni
University of Wisconsin–Madison College of Letters and Science alumni
Harvard University faculty
20th-century American economists
Writers from Massachusetts
Cornell University faculty
Members of the Colorado House of Representatives